Wishes are hopes or desires.

Wishes may also refer to:

Albums
 Wishes (Lari White album), 1994, or the title song
 Wishes, a Buckethead album and song
 Wishes (Jon Butcher album), or the title song
 Wishes (Kochi album), 1976
 Wishes (Rhodes album), 2015, or the title song
 Wishes (Voisper album), 2018
 Wishes (Margo Smith & Holly album), 1992
 Wishes: A Holiday Album, a 2002 jazz album by Kenny G, or the title song

Songs
 "Wishes" (Human Nature song), 1996
 Wishes (Oh Land song), 2019
 "Wishes", a song by The Melons

Other uses
 Wishes: A Magical Gathering of Disney Dreams, a fireworks spectacular at the Magic Kingdom theme park in Florida and at Disneyland Park in Paris
 Wishes (TV series), a Singaporean kids drama
 WISHES (Erasmus mundus project)

See also
 Wish (disambiguation)